Caron or háček, is a diacritic ( ˇ ).

Caron may also refer to:

Places 
 Caron, Saskatchewan, a hamlet in Saskatchewan, Canada
 Rural Municipality of Caron No. 162, a rural municipality in Saskatchewan, Canada
 Caron, Western Australia, a town in Western Australia

Other uses 
 Caron (name)
 Parfums Caron, a French perfume house established in 1904

See also 
 Carron (disambiguation)
 Charon (disambiguation)
 Karon (disambiguation)